Often, discoveries and innovations are the work of multiple people, resulting from continual improvements over time. However, certain individuals are remembered for making significant contributions to the birth or development of a field or technology. These individuals may often be described as the "father" or "mother" of a particular field or invention, mostly in Western societies.

Fine art

Games

Humanities

Military

Nations

Natural and social sciences

Sports

Jukado/Modernized Ju Jitsu for self defense                                                                                                                                                                    
  Bruce Tegner      founded Jukado a form of Modernized Ju Jitsu based on Japanese Judo.Jujitsu,karate,Aikdo,and sticvk fighting in 1963 ,also followed by originally the publishing in the 1960s  the book "Bruce Tegner's Complete Book of Jukado Self Defense

Technology

Fields

Computing

Inventions

Transport

See also
 List of people considered father or mother of a field in India
 List of inventors
 List of pioneers in computer science
 Father of medicare
 Founders of statistics
 Father of the House
 Father (honorific)

References

 
 
Titles